Pilskalne Parish is an administrative unit of Aizkraukle Municipality in the Selonia region of Latvia. From 2009 until 2021, it was part of the former Nereta Municipality.

Villages and settlements of Pilskalne Parish 
 Gricgale
 Pilkalne
 Pilskalne

Parishes of Latvia
Aizkraukle Municipality
Selonia